Chandika Sthan is a Hindu temple situated in Munger, in the India state of Bihar. It is one of the fifty-one Shakti Peethas, places of worship consecrated to the goddess Shakti. On the Northeast corner of Munger, Chandika Sthan is just two kilometers away from the Munger town. Being a Siddhi-Peetha, Chandika Sthan is considered to be one of the most sacred and sanctified temples, as important as the Kamakshya temple near Guwahati.

Legend
Legendary tales and the Hindu folklore says that it was to save the world from the anger of Shiva, as he took the corpse of Sati and wandered. The same legend says that the left eye of the Sati fell at Munger, which subsequently developed into a place of worship of the Divine Mother Chandi. Among the different Shakti peethas Chandika Sthan is famous for the cure of eye troubles, as per the traditional belief of the local folklore.

The Chandika Sthan Temple as a Shakti Peeth

The Chandika Sthan Temple is believed to be a Shakti Peetha, the divine shrine of Shaktism. The mythology of Daksha Yaga and Sati's self-immolation and Shiva carrying the corpse of Sati Devi is the story of origin behind the Shakti Peetha shrines. It is believed that Sati Devi's left eye has fallen here.

King Karna
Another legend connected with Chandika Sthan is regarding King Karna of the ancient Indian kingdom of Anga, who used to worship goddess Chandi Mata every day and in turn, the Goddess gave him 114 pounds (equivalent to 50 kilograms) of gold for distribution among the needy and downtrodden at Karanchaura, now a local name for the vicinity.

Location
Chandika Sthan is approximately a 1 km distance from ITC Ltd, Basudeopur, Munger. The nearest railway station is Munger Junction, and the nearest airport is Patna Airport.

References

Shakti Peethas
Hindu temples in Bihar
Munger district